Golden Rock railway station (a.k.a. Ponmalai railway station) is a train station in Golden Rock, Tiruchirappalli. In addition to Golden Rock, it serves to people of Subramaniyapuram, Senthaneerpuram and Sangiliyandapuram.

Overview
Though small, this station handles very high traffic of passenger and freight trains. Towards west, trains proceeding to Thanjavur and towards north west connecting the chord line.

Developments
This facility has station master's panel room, relay room, and electrical and telecom equipment room.

In popular culture
The Tamil film Kedi Billa Killadi Ranga was extensively shot here.

References

External links 

Ponmalai (Golden Rock) railway station
Railway junction stations in Tamil Nadu